The Philippines has an exclusive economic zone that covers  of sea. This is due to the 7,641 islands comprising the Philippine archipelago. The coordinates are between 116° 40', and 126° 34' E longitude and 4° 40' and 21° 10' N latitude. It is bordered by the Philippine Sea to the east and north, the South China Sea to the west, and the Celebes Sea to the south.

Disputes 

The Philippines has territorial disputes in the South China Sea mainly with the People's Republic of China. Nearly the whole South China Sea is claimed by China with the nine-dash line. This line cuts half of  the Philippine's EEZ. In 2011, President Benigno Aquino III said "China's nine-dash line territorial claim over the entire South China Sea is against international laws, particularly the United Nations Convention of the Laws of the Sea (UNCLOS)". In 2013, China began building artificial islands and military bases on reefs in the Spratly Islands and on Scarborough Shoal which it seized in 2012. , China controls 20 outposts in the Paracel Islands and 7 in the Spratlys.

On June 12, 2019, a Chinese vessel collided and sank an anchored Philippine fishing boat (F/B Gem-Ver 1) near Recto Bank in the South China Sea. The Chinese vessel did not save the 22 Filipino fishermen on-board according to the Philippine Department of National Defense. A couple of minutes later, they were rescued by a Vietnamese fishing boat. The Armed Forces of the Philippines said the collision was "far from accidental."

On April 15, 2021, the National Task Force for the West Philippine Sea (NTF-WPS) reported that approximately 240,000 kilos (260 tons) of fish have been illegally taken by Chinese fishing vessels in the South China Sea every day. The Chinese fishing vessels operate around the Union Banks and Thitu Island (Pag-asa Islands). The overfishing causes the depletion of marine resources. During the same month, an estimated 240 Chinese vessels were illegally patrolling throughout the South China Sea.

In November 2021, two Filipino military supply boats were blocked by three Chinese coast guard ships which also fired water cannons. The supply vessels were headed to the Second Thomas Shoal which the Philippines claims to be within its exclusive economic zone. The atoll has been occupied by a Philippine military contingent since 1999. The incident was strongly condemned by Philippine Foreign Secretary Teodoro Locsin and Philippine President Rodrigo Duterte.

See also 
 West Philippine Sea
 Exclusive economic zone of Vietnam
 Exclusive economic zone of Malaysia

References

External links
 "NAMRIA draws PH-Indonesia EEZ Boundary Map", Infomapper 2014, pages 4–5

Philippines
Borders of the Philippines
Economy of the Philippines
China–Philippines relations